The Galesburg Historic District is a  historic district in Galesburg, Illinois. The district includes 1049 contributing buildings and contains the town's original plat as well as several older neighborhoods. The section of the district south of North Street encompasses Galesburg's historic city center and its most significant landmarks, such as the Knox County Courthouse, the Knox County Jail, the Burlington Depot (which has since been torn down), and Main Street's commercial buildings. Knox College, the school Galesburg was founded to serve, and its historic Old Main are also located in the southern half of the district. The area north of North Street is mainly residential and is dominated by Queen Anne and Classical Revival houses, including many transitional houses displaying elements of both styles.

The district was added to the National Register of Historic Places on November 21, 1976.

References

External links

Queen Anne architecture in Illinois
Romanesque Revival architecture in Illinois
Neoclassical architecture in Illinois
Geography of Knox County, Illinois
Historic districts on the National Register of Historic Places in Illinois
National Register of Historic Places in Knox County, Illinois